Ramblin' Jack Elliott (born Elliott Charles Adnopoz; August 1, 1931) is an American folk singer and songwriter.

Life and career
Elliott was born in 1931 in Brooklyn, New York, United States, the son of Florence (Rieger) and Abraham Adnopoz, an eminent doctor. His family was Jewish. He attended Midwood High School in Brooklyn and graduated in 1949. Elliott grew up inspired by the rodeos at Madison Square Garden, and wanted to be a cowboy. Encouraged instead to follow his father's example and become a surgeon, Elliott rebelled, running away from home at the age of 15 to join Col. Jim Eskew's Rodeo, the only rodeo east of the Mississippi. They traveled throughout the Mid-Atlantic states and New England. He was with them for only three months before his parents tracked him down and had him sent home, but Elliott was exposed to his first singing cowboy, Brahmer Rogers, a rodeo clown who played guitar and five-string banjo, sang songs, and recited poetry. Back home, Elliott taught himself guitar and started busking for a living. Eventually he got together with Woody Guthrie and stayed with him as an admirer and student. 

With banjo player Derroll Adams, he toured the United Kingdom and Europe. By 1960, he had recorded three folk albums for the UK record label Topic Records. In London, he played small clubs and pubs by day and West End cabaret nightclubs at night. When he returned to the States, Elliott found he had become renowned in American folk music circles.

Woody Guthrie had the greatest influence on Elliott. Guthrie's son, Arlo, said that because of Woody's illness and early death, Arlo never really got to know him, but learned his father's songs and performing style from Elliott and, according to Arlo, Woody Guthrie once said that Jack Elliot "Sounds more like me than I do" .  Elliott's guitar and his mastery of Guthrie's material had a big impact on Bob Dylan when he lived in Minneapolis. When he reached New York, Dylan was sometimes referred to as the 'son' of Jack Elliott, because Elliott had a way of introducing Dylan's songs with the words: "Here's a song from my son, Bob Dylan." Dylan rose to prominence as a songwriter; Elliott continued as an interpretative troubadour, bringing old songs to new audiences in his idiosyncratic manner. Elliott also influenced Phil Ochs, and played guitar and sang harmony on Ochs' cover of the song "Joe Hill" from the Tape from California album. Elliott also discovered singer-songwriter Guthrie Thomas in a bar in Northern California in 1973, bringing Thomas to Hollywood where Thomas' music career began.

Elliott appeared in Dylan's 1975-1976 Rolling Thunder Revue concert tour, and played "Longheno de Castro" in Dylan's movie Renaldo and Clara accompanied by guitarist Arlen Roth. In the movie, he sings the song "South Coast" by Lillian Bos Ross and Sam Eskin, from whose lyric the character's name is derived. Elliott also appears briefly in the 1983 film Breathless, starring Richard Gere and directed by Jim McBride.

Elliott plays guitar in both a traditional flatpicking style and a traditional fingerpicking style, depending on the song, which he matches with his laconic, humorous storytelling, often accompanying himself on harmonica. His singing has a strained, nasal quality which the young Bob Dylan emulated. His repertoire includes American traditional music from various genres, including country, blues, bluegrass and folk.

Elliott's nickname comes not from his traveling habits, but rather the countless stories he relates before answering the simplest of questions. Folk singer Odetta claimed that her mother gave him the name, remarking, "Oh, Jack Elliott, yeah, he can sure ramble on!"

His authenticity as a folksy, down-to-earth country boy, despite being a Jewish doctor's son from Brooklyn, and his disdain for other folk singers, were parodied by the Folksmen (Christopher Guest, Michael McKean, and Harry Shearer) in the satirical documentary A Mighty Wind in the name of their "hit" album Ramblin'. A Mighty Wind also referred to a former member of the New Main Street Singers, Ramblin' Sandy Pitnick, a somewhat geeky-looking white man in a cowboy hat, apparently in parody of Elliott.

Elliott's first recording in many years, South Coast, earned him his first Grammy Award in 1995. He was awarded the National Medal of Arts in 1998.

His long career and strained relationship with his daughter Aiyana were chronicled in her 2000 film documentary, The Ballad of Ramblin' Jack.

At the age of 75, he changed labels and released I Stand Alone on the ANTI- label, with an assortment of guest backup players including members of Wilco, X, and the Red Hot Chili Peppers. The album was produced by Ian Brennan. Jack said his intention was to title the album Not for the Tourists, because it was recorded partially in response to his daughter's request for songs he loved but never played in concert. When asked why he did not, he told her, "These songs are not for the tourists."

In 2012 he was featured on the song "Double Lifetime" on the album Older Than My Old Man Now by Loudon Wainwright III.

Elliott appeared with the Ramblin' Jackernacle Choir, adding vocals, yodels, hollers, to Bob Weir's 2016 solo album Blue Mountain, on the track "Ki-Yi Bossie".

Discography

Studio
1956: Woody Guthrie's Blues
1957: Jack Elliot Sings
1958: Jack Takes the Floor
1959: Ramblin' Jack Elliott in London EMI Records
1960: Ramblin' Jack Elliott Sings Songs by Woody Guthrie and Jimmie Rodgers
1960: Jack Elliott Sings the Songs of Woody Guthrie
1961: Songs to Grow On by Woody Guthrie, Sung by Jack Elliott (Folkways Records)
1961: Ramblin' Jack Elliott (Prestige/Folklore)
1962: Country Style (Prestige/Folklore)
1964: Jack Elliott (Vanguard)
1968: Young Brigham (Reprise)
1970: Bull Durham Sacks & Railroad Tracks (Reprise)
1981: Kerouac's Last Dream (Folk Freak/re-release by Conträr Musik, Germany)
1995: South Coast (Red House)
1998: Friends of Mine (HighTone)
1999: The Long Ride (HighTone)
2006: I Stand Alone (ANTI-)
2009: A Stranger Here (ANTI-)

Live
1957: The Lost Topic Tapes: Isle of Wight 1957
1962: Jack Elliott at the Second Fret

With Derroll Adams
1958: The Rambling Boys
1963: Roll On Buddy
1969: Folkland Songs
1969: Riding in Folkland
1975: America

Compilations
1963: Talking Woody Guthrie (Topic)
1964: Muleskinner (Topic)
1976: The Essential Ramblin' Jack Elliott (Vanguard)
1989: Hard Travelin' (reissue of Jack Elliott Sings the Songs of Woody Guthrie and Ramblin' Jack Elliott)
1989: Talking Dust Bowl: The Best of Ramblin' Jack Elliott
1990: Ramblin' Jack Elliott, Spider John Koerner, U. Utah Phillips: Legends of Folk (Red House)
1990: Jack Elliott Plus / Jack Elliott
1995: Me and Bobby McGee (reissue of Young Brigham and Bull Durham Sacks & Railroad Tracks)
1995: Jack Elliott: Ramblin' Jack, The Legendary Topic Masters
1999: Ramblin' Jack Elliott: Early Sessions
2000: Best of the Vanguard Years
2004: The Lost Topic Tapes: Cowes Harbour 1957
2004: The Lost Topic Tapes: Isle of Wight 1957
2007: Vanguard Visionaries

Additionally, Three Score and Ten, Topic Records' 70th-anniversary boxed set released in 2009, included "Talking Dustbowl Blues" from Woody Guthrie's Blues as track twelve on the seventh CD.

References

External links

 Illustrated Ramblin' Jack Elliott discography

 Anti- Records page featuring Jack's 2006 "I Stand Alone" CD.
 Ramblin' Jack Elliott Discography at Smithsonian Folkways

American street performers
American country singer-songwriters
American folk singers
American harmonica players
American male singer-songwriters
Singer-songwriters from New York (state)
Grammy Award winners
Jewish American musicians
United States National Medal of Arts recipients
1931 births
Living people
Jewish folk singers
American folk guitarists
American country guitarists
American acoustic guitarists
American male guitarists
Guitarists from New York (state)
20th-century American guitarists
Country musicians from New York (state)
20th-century American male musicians
Red House Records artists
21st-century American Jews
Anti- (record label) artists